Phylakopi, located at the northern coast of the island of Milos, is one of the most important Bronze Age settlements in the Aegean and especially in the Cyclades. The importance of Phylakopi is in its continuity throughout the Bronze Age (i.e. from the half of the 3rd millennium BC until the 12th century BC) and because of this, it is the type-site for the investigation of several chronological periods of the Aegean Bronze Age.

Excavations

Phylakopi was first excavated between 1896 and 1899 under the British School at Athens (as well as all subsequent projects). The excavation was remarkably ahead of its time, with Duncan MacKenzie (the later foreman to Sir Arthur Evans at Knossos) recording detailed stratigraphic information. The excavation revealed a hitherto unknown Bronze Age Cycladic settlement with continuity throughout the Early Bronze Age to the very end of the Late Bronze Age. It was from this excavation that the three phase stratigraphy was suggested, the second and third phases relating to periods of Minoan and Mycenaean influence respectively. The settlement was re-excavated in 1910-11 with a focus on refining ceramic chronology. The most recent excavation at the site was conducted by Professor Colin Renfrew. The excavations were covered in two monographs  and revealed a previously unknown Sanctuary.

Bronze Age

Phylakopi I
The first phase of the site (Phylakopi I: 2300-2000 B.C) dates from the middle of the Early Bronze Age to the middle of the Middle Bronze Age. Architecture is first found in Phylakopi I and settlement grew throughout the Phylakopi I phase.

Phylakopi II
It is during the second phase (Phylakopi II: 2000-1550 BC) that the settlement flourishes and becomes a major player in the Cyclades. Phylakopi II was densely occupied, with blocks of houses separated by long, straight streets. This phase is famous for the Cycladic artistic flair as seen on several pottery styles, such as "Dark Burnished ware" and "Cycladic white". The vessels often contain stylised plant and animal motifs in black and red matt paint, though most famous are the Melian bird jugs exported to Knossos. Towards the end of the period increasing amounts of Minoan pottery were found at the site, marking the start of a period of "Minoanisation", which is more visible at the start of Phylakopi III.

Phylakopi III
The Phylakopi III (1550-1100 B.C) city was constructed after the complete destruction of Phylakopi II, most likely due to earthquake activity. The phase can be divided into three sub-phases. Phylakopi III-i sees Minoan forms begin to become more popular. Research suggests several architectural features can be ascribed to this phase. One structure, called the 'Pillar Room', was constructed with pillars and ashlar blocks. The interior contained traces of a well-preserved fresco, which depicted a delightful flying fish. The so-called 'Mansion' likely served as an administrative centre for the settlement, owing to discovery of a Linear A tablet fragment found within the structure. The settlement also appears to have been walled during this period. The pottery of Phylakopi III:i is heavily influenced by Minoan forms and motifs, which, along with Minoan influence in architecture, has led to the suggestion that Phylakopi was under the political control of the Minoans. Though it may be possible that Minoan ideas and culture became popular within elite circles in the Aegean and were adopted as a marker of social differentiation and "prestige". Phylakopi III:ii sees a regression of Minoan influence after the eruption of the Thera (Santorini) volcano in LM IA (c. 1500 B.C). The phase is lacking in identifiable architectural features, though much of the pottery discovered during the 1896-99 excavations was from this phase. Mycenaean influence first becomes perceptible, primarily through Mycenaean pottery. Mycenaean influence becomes more prevalent in Phylakopi III:iii, with the construction of a megaron, a sanctuary with Mycenaean figurines, a new fortification wall and the predominance of Mycenaean pottery, to the almost extinction of Cycladic pottery styles. The construction of a megaron, a feature of the Mycenaean palaces of the Greek mainland, has led to the suggestion that the Mycenaeans conquered and administered the settlement.

Subsequent history 

The settlement was abandoned at the end of the Late Bronze Age and never re-occupied. Today the sea has eroded a very large part of the city site. Some time before the first excavations, there were reports of looting of antiquities from the site.

See also
 Phylakopi I culture
 History of the Cyclades
 Cycladic art
 Goulandris Museum of Cycladic Art
 Archaeological Museum of Milos

References

External links
The prehistoric settlement at Phylakopi - Melos
Hellenic Ministry of Culture - Phylakopi

Cyclades
Cycladic civilization
Ancient Milos